Stories of the Danube is a symphony by Joe Zawinul, which was commissioned by the Brucknerhaus, Linz. It was first performed as part of the Linzer Klangwolke (a large-scale open-air broadcast event), for the opening of the 1993 Bruckner Festival in Linz, on September 12. In its seven movements (plus a finale), the symphony traces the course of the Danube from Donaueschingen through various countries ending at the Black Sea.

Recording 
The symphony was recorded as a studio album by the Brno Philharmonic Orchestra, conducted by Caspar Richter, at Dukla Radio Studio, Brno, in November 1995 and Music Room, New York City, in February 1996.

Track listing
 "Beginning: In the depths of the forest a spring wells up: A river is born" – 5:49
 "Mountain Waters: Waterfalls of melted snow cascade into the young river" – 3:30
 "Empire: An impression of life in the reign of emperor Franz Joseph at the turn of the century" – 11:22
 "Intro" – 3:52
 "Gypsy: History of a free people without a home" – 7:35
 "Voice of the Danube: On the riverbed, an imposing rock watches History" – 5:53
 "Unknown Soldier: A stream of blood and violence: The Second World War" – 5:52
 "Intro" – 4:26
 "Sultan: 900 years of Ottoman Empire" – 7:59
 "Finale: The nations of the Danube celebrate peace" – 2:33

Personnel 
 Joe Zawinul - keyboards, vocals
 Caspar Richter - conductor
 Amit Chatterjee - guitar, vocals
 Burhan Öçal - percussion, vocals
 Arto Tunçboyacıyan - percussion, vocals 
 Walter Grassman - drums
 Brno Philharmonic Orchestra

References 

1996 albums
Joe Zawinul albums
1993 in music
Zawinul